Algoma High School is a public high school in Algoma, Wisconsin, United States. It is part of the Algoma School District.

History 
Algoma High School opened in 1885. It was housed with the grade school in various different buildings, including a Public Works Administration building. In 1966, a referendum to build a new school passed, with that building opening in 1969.

The school began a mentoring program in 2018; the Wolf Den program and a separate Wolf Tech technical education and vocational program were features of an award-winning All-America City Award presentation in 2020.

Athletics 
The school's athletic teams are known as the Wolves, and compete in the Packerland Conference, an affiliate of the Wisconsin Interscholastic Athletic Association. The Wolves have won six state championships:

Performing arts 
Algoma had a competitive marching band in the late 1920s.

Notable alumni 
 Richard W. Fellows, United States Air Force officer

References

External links 
 

Public high schools in Wisconsin
Schools in Kewaunee County, Wisconsin
Educational institutions established in 1885
1885 establishments in Wisconsin